LOHRO is an acronym for the local radio station of the Hanseatic City of Rostock. LOHRO is a member of the German Federal Association of Free Radios (BFR). The radio station is maintained by two associations: Kulturnetzwerk e.V. acts as license holder and  supports the radio station and organizes trainings. The radio station raises money for operations through project funds from several organizations, membership fees from associations, and sponsorships.

History 

After repeated trial operations, such as at the local Hanse Sail festival, LOHRO started airing around the clock on 1 July 2005. The programme was licensed as a pilot project until 2010. The Media Analysis Committee of the state of Mecklenburg-Western Pomerania authorized Kulturnetzwerk e.V. as a broadcaster according to its Broadcasting Act (RundfG MV) on 30 June 2010. Thereby, the existing frequency was extended to LOHRO for ten more years, effective as of 1 January 2011.

Program 
A relatively fixed schedule contains daily, weekly, and monthly radio shows. Contrary to the common self-responsibility of each program at open channels, the broadcast station takes responsibility as complete unit.

See also 
 List of radio stations in Germany

References

External links
 Official website

Radio stations in Germany
Mass media in Rostock
Organizations established in 2005